Jiří Sabou (born 5 December 1974 in Beroun) is a Czech professional footballer (midfielder).

Career
Born in Beroun, Sabou began playing youth football for FK Beroun. He joined FK Viktoria Žižkov in 1998 and would play for the club until it was relegated from the Czech top flight in 2004. Sabou joined FK Teplice for the next four seasons. He rejoined Viktoria Žižkov in January 2009, and in his first match on 22 February 2009 he received a yellow card after 10 minutes and then scored an equaliser with the last touch of the game, 3 minutes into time added on.

External links
 Player profile 
Profile at JFK-Fotbal

1974 births
Living people
People from Beroun
Czech footballers
Czech First League players
FK Viktoria Žižkov players
FK Teplice players
Association football midfielders
Sportspeople from the Central Bohemian Region